The 393rd Bomb Squadron is part of the 509th Bomb Wing at Whiteman Air Force Base, Missouri. It operates Northrop Grumman B-2 Spirit nuclear-capable strategic bomber aircraft.

The squadron was first organized in March 1944 as the 393rd Bombardment Squadron.  In November 1944, the squadron transferred to the 509th Composite Group and began training for the delivery of nuclear weapons. In May 1945, it deployed to the Mariana Islands, where it became the only unit to use nuclear weapons in combat, when its aircraft dropped atomic bombs on Hiroshima and Nagasaki on 6 August 1945 and 9 August 1945. After V-J Day, the squadron returned to the United States, and was stationed at Roswell Army Air Field, New Mexico.

During the early years of the Cold War, the squadron was involved in Operation Crossroads, nuclear weapons testing on Bikini Atoll., and has continued to operate nuclear-capable aircraft since then. At Roswell, the squadron upgraded to Boeing B-50 Superfortresses and later, to jet powered Boeing B-47 Stratojets.  When Walker Air Force Base closed in 1958, the squadron and its B-47s moved to Pease Air Force Base, New Hampshire.  At Pease, it replaced its B-47s with Boeing B-52 Stratofortresses in 1966, and in 1970, became one of only two wings in Strategic Air Command to equip with the General Dynamics FB-111.

With the phaseout of the FB-111 and closure of Pease, the squadron moved as a paper unit to Whiteman Air Force Base, Missouri in 1990.  In 1993, it began to receive Northrop Grumman B-2 Spirit stealth bombers and became operational as the only regular Air Force unit to operate these aircraft.

History
The 393rd Bomb Squadron was activated as a Boeing B-29 Superfortress squadron in early 1944; trained under the Second Air Force. Due to a shortage of B-29s, the squadron was initially equipped with former II Bomber Command Boeing B-17 Flying Fortresses previously used for training heavy bomber replacement personnel as engineering flaws were being worked out of the B-29. The squadron was then reassigned for advanced training and received B-29s at Fairmont Army Air Field, Nebraska during the late spring and summer of 1944.

509th Composite Group
In December 1944 reassigned as the only operational B-29 squadron to the 509th Composite Group at Wendover Field, Utah in December. Aircraft were refitted to the Silverplate configuration becoming atomic bomb capable under a highly classified program. They were then deployed to North Field (Tinian) in late May 1945, flying non-combat missions practicing atomic bomb delivery techniques. The squadron was the only unit in the world to ever carry out and deliver nuclear weapons in combat, as they dropped the first atomic bomb on Hiroshima, Japan, on 6 August 1945, and the second atomic bomb on Nagasaki, Japan, on 9 August 1945.

Reassigned to the United States in November 1945, it became part of Continental Air Forces (later Strategic Air Command). The unit was deployed to Kwajalein Atoll in 1946 to carry out Operation Crossroads which was a series of atomic bomb tests on Bikini Atoll in July.

Strategic Air Command
The squadron began upgrading to the new Boeing B-50 Superfortress, an advanced version of the B-29 in 1949. The B-50 gave the unit the capability to carry heavy loads of conventional weapons faster and farther as well as being designed for nuclear deployment missions if necessary. The squadron deployed to SAC airfields in England, and to Andersen Air Force Base, Guam on long-term deployments in the 1950s.

By 1951, the emergence of the Soviet Mikoyan-Gurevich MiG-15 interceptor in the skies of North Korea signalled the end of the propeller-driven B-50 as a first-line strategic bomber. Received new, swept-wing Boeing B-47 Stratojets in 1955 which were designed to carry nuclear weapons and to penetrate Soviet air defenses with their high operational ceiling and near supersonic speed. The squadron flew the B-47 for about a decade but by the mid-1960s it had become obsolete and vulnerable to new Soviet air defenses. The squadron began to send its Stratojets to AMARC at Davis-Monthan Air Force Base, Arizona for retirement in 1965.

The squadron was scheduled for inactivation; it instead received Boeing B-52D Stratofortresses in 1965. It rotated aircraft and crews to Andersen Air Force Base, Guam in support of Southeast Asia Operation Arc Light operations between 1966 and 1969. The squadron was not operational from November 1969 to June 1971. Re-equipped with General Dynamics FB-111 nuclear-capable medium bombers in 1970, the squadron operated until retirement in 1990.

It was reactivated in 1993 as the first operational Northrop Grumman B-2 Spirit stealth bomber squadron.

Operations and decorations
 Combat operations: Combat in Western Pacific, 1 Jul – 14 Aug 1945. Only squadron trained for atomic warfare in World War II.  Participated in atomic bomb tests on Bikini Atoll, Jul 1946, while deployed on Kwajalein. Rotated aircraft and crews to Andersen AFB, Guam, in support of Southeast Asia Operations, 1966–1969.
 Campaigns:  World War II: Air Offensive, Japan; Eastern Mandates; Western Pacific. Vietnam War; Global War on Terror.
 Decorations: Air Force Outstanding Unit Awards: Apr – 1 Oct 1968; 1 Jul 1977 – 30 Jun 1979; 1 Jul 1981 – 30 Jun 1982; 1 Jul 1982 – 30 Jun 1984; 1 Jul 1988 – 30 Jun 1990. Republic of Vietnam Gallantry Cross with Palm: 5 Mar – 14 Oct 1969.

Lineage
 Constituted as the 393d Bombardment Squadron, Very Heavy on 28 February 1944
 Activated on 11 Mar 1944
 Redesignated 393d Bombardment Squadron, Medium on 2 July 1948
 Redesignated 393d Bombardment Squadron, Heavy on 2 April 1966
 Redesignated 393d Bombardment Squadron, Medium on 1 December 1969
 Inactivated on 30 September 1990
 Redesignated 393d Bomb Squadron on 12 March 1993
 Activated on 27 August 1993

Assignments
 504th Bombardment Group, 11 March 1944
 Second Air Force, 25 November 1944
 509th Composite Group (later 509th Bombardment Group), 17 December 1944 (attached to 509th Bombardment Wing, 17 November 1947 – 14 Sept 1948 and after 1 February 1951)
 509th Bombardment Wing, 16 June 1952 – 30 September 1990
 509th Operations Group, 27 Aug 1993– present

Stations
 Dalhart Army Air Field, Texas, 11 March 1944
 Fairmont Army Air Field, Nebraska, 12 March 1944
 Wendover Field, Utah, 14 September 1944 – 26 April 1945
 North Field, Tinian, 30 May–17 October 1945
 Roswell Army Air Field (later Walker Air Force Base), New Mexico, 6 November 1945
 Deployed to Bucholz Army Airfield, Kwajalein, Marshall Islands, 1 May–July 1946; RAF Mildenhall, England, 4 June–2 September 1952; Andersen Air Force Base, Guam, 18 June–c. 18 September 1953 and 10 July–8 October 1954; RAF Upper Heyford, England, 26 January–30 April 1956
 Pease Air Force Base, New Hampshire, 1 July 1958 – 30 September 1990
 Whiteman Air Force Base, Missouri, 27 August 1993 – present

Aircraft

 Boeing B-17 Flying Fortress (1944)
 Boeing B-29 Superfortress (1944–1952)
 Boeing B-50 Superfortress (1949–1955)
 Boeing B-47 Stratojet (1955–1965)

 Boeing B-52 Stratofortress (1966–1969)
 General Dynamics FB-111A Aardvark (1970–1990)
 Northrop Grumman B-2 Spirit (1993–present)

See also

 Atomic bombings of Hiroshima and Nagasaki
 List of B-52 Units of the United States Air Force

References

Notes
 Explanatory notes

 Citations

Bibliography

 
 
 
 
 

Military units and formations in Missouri
393
Military units and formations established in 1944